The Irish film industry produced over fifty feature films in 2015. This article fully lists all non-pornographic films, including short films, that had a release date in that year and which were at least partly made by the Republic of Ireland. It does not include films first released in previous years that had release dates in 2015. Nor does it include films made by Northern Ireland, which are included in List of British films of 2015.  Also included is an overview of the major events in Irish film, including film festivals and awards ceremonies, as well as lists of those films that have been particularly well received, both critically and financially.

Major Releases

See also

 2015 in film
 2015 in Ireland
 Cinema of Ireland
 List of Irish submissions for the Academy Award for Best Foreign Language Film

References

External links
 

Irish
Films
2015